John Chichester may refer to:

Chichester of Raleigh, Devon, England
Sir John Chichester (died 1569), of Raleigh, Sheriff of Devon
Sir John Chichester (died 1586), Sheriff of Devon
Sir John Chichester, 1st Baronet (1623–1667) of the Chichester baronets of Raleigh
Sir John Chichester, 2nd Baronet (c. 1658–1680) of the Chichester baronets of Raleigh
Sir John Chichester, 4th Baronet (1669–1740) of the Chichester baronets of Raleigh
Sir John Chichester, 5th Baronet (1721–1784) of the Chichester baronets of Raleigh
Sir John Chichester, 6th Baronet (c. 1752–1808) of the Chichester baronets of Raleigh
Sir John Chichester, 11th Baronet of the Chichester baronets of Raleigh

Other
Sir John Chichester, 1st Baronet, of Arlington Court (c. 1794–1851), English Whig and Liberal politician
John Chichester (American politician) (born 1937), American politician in Virginia
Lord John Chichester (1811–1873), Anglo-Irish Member of Parliament
John Chichester (d.1669) of Hall (1598–1669), Member of Parliament for Lostwithiel in Cornwall

See also